The Kong Empire (1710–1898), also known as the Wattara Empire or Ouattara Empire for its founder, was a pre-colonial African Muslim state centered in northeastern Ivory Coast that also encompassed much of present-day Burkina Faso.  It was founded by Dyula immigrants from the declining Mali Empire.  It established a largely decentralized commercial empire based upon linkages by merchant houses protecting trade routes throughout the region.  Kong rose to prominence in the 1800s as a key commercial center and center of Islamic studies.  In 1898, Samori Ture attacked the city and burnt it down.  Although the city was rebuilt, the Kong empire had dissipated and the French took control over the area.

History

Founding
The area around Kong had been settled primarily by Gur-speaking agriculturalists: primarily the Senufo people and Tyefo people.  Starting in the 16th century, Dyula speakers, an important branch of the Mandé, migrated from the declining Mali Empire into the area and founded the city of Bego.  The immigrants were largely Muslim while the Senufo and Tyefo populations were primarily animist.  Bego was destroyed at some point and the Dyula residents moved to the city of Kong.  The area became a site for expansion, raiding and warfare of a number of regional powers, mainly Gonja and Dagomba.  In this context, a set of heterogeneous populations and a set of different war houses (merchants with a large number of mercenaries and slaves dedicated largely to warfare) developed in the city of Kong.

The documented history shows that in the early 1700s, Seku Wattara (sometimes written as Sekou or Sekoue) deposed and killed an important leader in Kong, Lasiri Gbambele, by uniting the forces of a number of Dyula leaders in the area. Seku used this consolidated power to control politics in Kong and create a large sphere of influence throughout the region. But the Senofo People founded Khorhogo, the capital of the Senofo People and future capital of Kong in the 11th Century.

Oral history traditions provide additional details but vary greatly in their discussion of the founding of the Kong Empire.  A common telling claims that Seku came from the town of Tenegala, a city  and larger than Kong at the time.  By 1709, Seku was the richest person in Tenegala and used his war house to assist the leader of Gonja in an assault on Bouna, an endeavor that provided him with significantly more slaves for his war house and firearms.  Lasiri Gbambele was Seku's uncle through his father and a powerful leader in Kong.  Although they were related, there was significant discord as a result of a dispute between Lasiri and Seku's father about the woman who would become Seku's mother.  This oral tradition claims that in 1710 Lasiri used his power to suppress Islam in Kong and embrace the indigenous Nya cult.  The crisis developed when Lasiri expelled a Muslim cleric from Kong and Seku brought together his forces with those of other Dyula leaders to attack Kong.  Lasiri was defeated and executed by Seku.

Under Seku

The Kong Empire was under Seku lasted from around 1710 until 1740 (with the death of his brother Famaga).  After establishing control over Kong, forces under Seku and allied leaders with their own war houses, took over towns and settlements throughout the region mainly focused on control of trade routes.  They took over the region around the Black Volta to the north early during Seku's reign and to the south to Boule.  In the south, the forces of the Kong Empire ran into the growing Ashanti Empire about control over Gyaaman leading to a significant series of battles ending in Ashanti control over Gyaaman, but recognition of the authority of the Kong Empire.  To establish stable control, Seku appointed each of his twelve sons as chiefs of crucial settlements throughout the region.

Seku died in 1735 and the empire largely fell into disarray.  His son, Kerei-Mori, asserted authority but Seku's brother Famaga refused to recognize his claim and so took control over large parts of the northern settlements and operated out of Bobo-Dioulasso.  Although there was a significant internal rivalry between the force of Kere-Mori and Famaga they were allied for external purposes.  This was most crucial in the 1730 expeditions north of the Black Volta toward the Niger River. In November 1739, the combined forces took over a number of important cities including the trade post of Sofara.  The forces reached the important city of Djenné-Djenno, on the banks of the Niger River before they were pushed back by forces of Bitòn Coulibaly.

Decentralized Kong
From about 1740 until the destruction of Kong in 1898, a politically decentralized state existed with its center in the city of Kong.   The alliances that held the Empire together under Seku largely dissipated and the state was held together largely through linked settlements and outposts ruled by different members of a merchant class located in Kong.  Kong became a regional commercial center and a center for Islamic studies during this period.

Crucial to the organization of the Kong Empire was the existence of a merchant class that directed many of the political aspects.  These merchants were significant for the trade they directed but also because each merchant family established a series of key trading outposts along key routes protected by slave warriors.  These war houses thus protected the trade routes for the merchants and also allowed raiding and organized warfare to occur largely directed by the merchants.  Two of the most important houses were those linked to the lineage of Seku and Famaga.  The chieftains linking their lineage to Seku often took the name Wattara to signify this relationship.

With these crucial routes controlled, Kong became a center of trade for both gold and kola nuts.  This increased the importance of the cities and the ability for the private merchant armies to grow significantly larger.

The city became notable for a large number of Islamic clerics and scholars in the city and for regular mosque construction throughout the Empire. However, the importance to Islam did not impact the ruling aristocracy in their management of state: they derived no legitimacy from Islam, they did not implement Sharia, and were thus fundamentally different from the jihad states of West Africa. Importantly, the warrior class created in the Empire, the sonangi, were not adherents to Islam and as time grew on, largely lived in separate communities practicing animist faiths.  Augustus Henry Keane wrote in 1907 that "Nor is Kong a hotbed of Moslem fanaticism, as has also been supposed; but on the contrary, a place distinguished, one might almost say, by its religious indifference, or at all events by its tolerant spirit and wise respect for all the religious views of the surrounding indigenous populations."

Ethnic relations remained largely split between the Mandé merchants and urban citizens and the Senufo agricultural population.  There were few attempts to create an ethnically homogenous population by the leadership and thus these ethnic groups existed largely with one another, and other immigrant populations.

Although politically decentralized, the empire did continue to assert control over territory.  In 1840, the empire took limited control over the gold trade out of Lobi country.

Decline and fall
Kong power and control of trade over the territory decreased significantly in the later part of the 1800s.  Although the importance of the city in terms of commerce and Islamic study persisted, its independence and sphere of influence had decreased.

On 20 February 1888, Louis Gustave Binger entered Kong and made agreements with the leaders as part of the control of the area by France as part of French West Africa.  These agreements made Kong a key target for attacks from Samori Ture as a front in the Mandingo Wars between the Wassoulou Empire and the French.  In 1897, Samori defeated the last forces of Kong and burnt the town to the ground causing members of Seku's royal house to flee to the north.

The remaining members of Seku's royal house took refuge in the Black Volta region where they divided territory creating what the French called "Les Etats de Kong." These kingdoms lasted for a short time before losing relevance to French colonial administration in 1898. The city of Kong was rebuilt by the French, but only about 3,000 residents returned and the city decreased significantly in relevance.

References

Former monarchies of Africa
Countries in precolonial Africa
States and territories established in 1710
1895 disestablishments
History of Burkina Faso
History of Ivory Coast
1710 establishments in Africa
Former empires
Former empires in Africa